The 1992 Cork Senior Hurling Championship was the 104th staging of the Cork Senior Hurling Championship since its establishment by the Cork County Board in 1887. The draw for the opening fixtures took place on 15 December 1991. The championship began on 13 June 1992 and ended on 11 October 1992.

Midleton entered the championship as the defending champions, however, they were defeated by Na Piarsaigh in the second round.

The final was played on 11 October 1992 at Páirc Uí Chaoimh in Cork between Erin's Own and Na Piarsaigh, in what was their first ever meeting in a final. Erin's Own won the match by 1-12 to 0-12 to claim their first ever championship title.

Brian Corcoran of Erin's Own was the championship's top scorer with 0-44.

Team changes

To Championship

Promoted from the Cork Intermediate Hurling Championship
 Tracton

Results

First round

Second round

Quarter-finals

Semi-finals

Final

Championship statistics

Top scorers

Overall

In a single game

Miscellaneous

 Erin's Own win their first title in their first appearance in the final.

References

Cork Senior Hurling Championship
Cork Senior Hurling Championship